United Jewish Socialist Workers Party (fareynikte yidishe sotsialistishe arbeter-partey) was a political party that emerged in Russia in the wake of the 1917 February Revolution. Members of the party along with the Poalei Zion participated in the government of Ukraine and condemned the October Revolution.

Its followers were generally known simply for the first portion of the name Fareynikte (פֿאַראײניקטע) - 'United'. Politically the party favored national personal autonomy for the Jewish community. The party upheld the ideas of building a secular Jewish community.

Fareynikte was founded in June 1917 through the merger of two groups, the Zionist Socialist Workers Party (SSRP) (Socialist-Territorialists) and the Jewish Socialist Workers Party (SERP). SERP's ideology was based particularly upon "autonomism". Note that some of the leaders from those two parties did not join Fareynikte, but rather became "Folkists" (Folkspartei). Both SSRP and SERP had emerged from the Vozrozhdenie group. As of early 1918, Fareynikte was the largest Jewish autonomist political party in the independent Ukraine.

The Faraynikte's program claimed "unity of the Jewish worker's class as an integral part of the 'extraterritorial' Jewish nation and international proletariat". The previous arguments in regard to the way of implementing the territorialists program have been declared as less important. The focal point of the party program a "national-individual autonomy". For a brief period the party acquired a major influence, particularly in Ukraine where it played an important role in an attempt to organize the Jewish national autonomy. In September 1917 Fareynikte petitioned to the Provisional Government to declare the equality of language.

In the 1917 elections in Russia, the party obtained around 8% of the Jewish votes.

Fareynikt Moishe Zilberfarb was Deputy-Secretary of Jewish Affairs in the General Secretariat of Ukraine, the main executive institution of the Ukrainian People's Republic from June 28, 1917 to January 22, 1918.

Fareynikte ran some Yiddish newspapers in Ukraine. It published the Naye tsayt (New Time) in Kyiv September 1917-May 1919. Prior to the publishing of Naye tsayt, the party published Der yidisher proletarier from Kyiv.

In Poland, dissidents from the Fareynikte party joined the Communist Party of Poland. The remainder of the party, which had taken the name Jewish Socialist Workers Party 'Ferajnigte' in Poland, merged into the Independent Socialist Labour Party in 1922.

See also
Biuro Centralne Bezpartyjnych Związków Zawodowych

References

1917 establishments in Russia
1922 disestablishments in Poland
Defunct socialist parties in Poland
Defunct socialist parties in Ukraine
Jewish Polish history
Jewish political parties
Jewish socialism
Jewish Ukrainian history
Labour parties in Ukraine
Political parties disestablished in 1937
Political parties established in 1917
Political parties of minorities in Poland
Political parties of minorities in Ukraine
Political parties of the Russian Revolution
Ukrainian Soviet Socialist Republic
Secular Jewish culture in Europe